Hariprobha Takeda (1890-1972) also known as Hariprobha Basu Mallik was a Bengali woman who married a Japanese national. She lived in Japan and wrote a notable autobiography which was turned into a movie in Bangladesh.

Personal life

In 1907 Hariprobha married Wemon Takeda, a Japanese businessman residing in Dhaka, East Bengal. He manufactured soaps in Bulbul soap factory. Hariprobha moved to Tokyo, Japan in 1912. She published Bongo Mohilar Japan Jatra (A Bengali Lady's Visit to Japan), which detailed her travels and experiences there. She settled permanently in Japan in 1941.

World War II 

She worked for the Japanese imperial army broadcasting messages/news for the Bengali Indian National Army led Subhas Chandra Bose from 1944–1945. The Indian National Army was allied with Japan during World War II. During the war her husband fell ill. She travelled to work at the dead of night to avoid allied bombing of Tokyo. She wrote another book about the effect of the war on the Japanese people. She was aided in her broadcasts by Rash Behari Bose. She moved to Jalpaiguri, West Bengal, after her husband's death.

Legacy
Hariprobha died in 1972 in Shambhunath Pandit Hospital, Kolkata, West Bengal. Tanvir Mokammel have made a documentary based on her book and her life called Japani Bodhu (The Japanese Wife).

References

1972 deaths
Indian independence movement
Indian Independence League
People from Dhaka District
Bengali people
Emigrants from British India to Japan
Naturalized citizens of Japan
1890 births
Japanese non-fiction writers
20th-century Japanese women writers

Writers from Kolkata